The 1939 John Carroll Blue Streaks football team was an American football team that represented John Carroll University in the Ohio Athletic Conference during the 1939 college football season. The team compiled a 7–1 record.  John Carroll won its first Big Four conference title, going a perfect 3–0.

Tom Conley was the team's head coach for the fourth year. Conley had been the captain of the national champion 1930 Notre Dame Fighting Irish football team  – Knute Rockne's last team.

Five John Carroll players received honors from the United Press on its 1939 All-Ohio Conference football team. End Jack Dewan won first-team honors, and four others received second-team recognition: tackle Sulzer; guard Rancourt; halfback Carl Estenik; and fullback Young.

Schedule

References

John Carroll
John Carroll Blue Streaks football seasons
John Carroll Blue Streaks football